is a town located in Minamikawachi District, Osaka Prefecture, Japan. , the town had an estimated population of  15,429 and a population density of 610 persons per km².

Geography 
Kanan is located in the southeastern part of Osaka Prefecture on the west side of Kongō Range and Katsuragi Mountains which separate Osaka from Nara Prefecture. It is approximately 25 kilometers from central Osaka City. The town is roughly square, measuring 7.5 kilometers east-to-west by 6.7 kilometers north-to-south. The landscape is hilly or mountainous, with about a third of the town area within the borders of Kongō-Ikoma-Kisen Quasi-National Park.

Neighboring municipalities 
Osaka Prefecture
 Tondabayashi
 Taishi
 Chihayaakasaka
Nara Prefecture
 Katsuragi

Climate
Kanan has a Humid subtropical climate (Köppen Cfa) characterized by warm summers and cool winters with light to no snowfall.

Demographics
Per Japanese census data, the population of Kanan has increased steadily since the 1970s.

History
The area of the modern town of Kanan was within ancient Kawachi Province. The area has many kofun burial mounds and ancient Buddhist temples.  The villages of Ishikawa, Shiraki, Kochi, and Nakamura were established within Ishikawa District with the creation of the modern municipalities system on April 1, 1889.  On April 1, 1896 the area became part of Minamikawachi District, Osaka. The four villages merged on September 3, 1956 to form the town of Kanan.

Government
Kanan has a mayor-council form of government with a directly elected mayor and a unicameral city council of 12 members. Kanan collectively with the cities of Tondabayashi and Ōsakasayama, and other municipalities of Minamikawachi District contributes two members to the Osaka Prefectural Assembly. In terms of national politics, the city is part of Osaka 15th district of the lower house of the Diet of Japan.

Economy
Kanan was traditionally dependent on agriculture (eggplants, cucumbers) and forestry, with forests occupying half the town area. Manufacturing is centered around pulp and paper and paper-manufactured goods.

Education
Kanan has two public elementary schools and two public middle schools operated by the town government. The town does not have and a public high school; however, the Osaka University of Arts is located in the town.

Transportation

Railway
Kanan does not have any passenger rail service. The nearest station is Tondabayashi Station on the Kintetsu Nagano Line.

Highway

Local attractions 
Ichisuka Kofun Cluster,  National Historic Site 
Kanayama Kofun, National Historic Site
Hirokawa-dera, Buddhist temple with grave of Saigyō

Notable people from Kanan
Naokazu Takemoto, politician

Notes

External links 

 

Towns in Osaka Prefecture
Kanan, Osaka